Liotia squamicostata is a species of small sea snail, a marine gastropod mollusk, in the family Liotiidae.

Distribution
This species occurs in the Indian Ocean off the Maldives.

References

External links
 To World Register of Marine Species

squamicostata
Gastropods described in 1903